Torvothrips is a genus of tube-tailed thrips in the family Phlaeothripidae. There are at least two described species in Torvothrips.

Species
These two species belong to the genus Torvothrips:
 Torvothrips kosztarabi Johansen, 1980
 Torvothrips peuctraus Johansen

References

Further reading

 
 
 
 
 
 
 

Phlaeothripidae
Articles created by Qbugbot